The 2000 World Short Track Speed Skating Championships took place between March 10 and 12, 2000 in Sheffield, United Kingdom. The World Championships are organised by the ISU which also run world cups and championships in speed skating and figure skating.

Results

Men

* First place is awarded 34 points, second is awarded 21 points, third is awarded 13 points, fourth is awarded 8 points, fifth is awarded 5 points, sixth is awarded 3 points, seventh is awarded 2 points, and eighth is awarded 1 point in the finals of each individual race to determine the overall world champion. The relays do not count for the overall classification.

Women

* First place is awarded 34 points, second is awarded 21 points, third is awarded 13 points, fourth is awarded 8 points, fifth is awarded 5 points, sixth is awarded 3 points, seventh is awarded 2 points, and eighth is awarded 1 point in the finals of each individual race to determine the overall world champion. The relays do not count for the overall classification.

Medal table

External links
 ISU Results

World Short Track Speed Skating Championships
World Short Track Speed Skating Championships
2000 in short track speed skating